Michael Flynn (born 1958) was a U.S. Army lieutenant general. General Flynn may also refer to:

Charles A. Flynn (born 1963), U.S. Army general
John P. Flynn (1922–1997), U.S. Air Force lieutenant general
Thomas J. Flynn (born 1930), U.S. Army major general